The Battle of Little Muddy Creek, also known as the Lame Deer Fight, was fought on May 7–8, 1877, by United States soldiers and scouts against a village of Miniconjou Lakota and Northern Cheyenne. The battle occurred near Little Muddy Creek in Montana Territory, near present-day Lame Deer, Rosebud County.

Background 
On May 1, 1877, Colonel Nelson A. Miles led a mixed force of his own 5th Regiment, the 22nd Regiment, and the 2nd Cavalry Regiment out of Fort Keogh in search of Miniconjou Lakota under Lame Deer. On the Tongue River, Indian scouts found a trail heading west to Rosebud Creek, and Miles followed with his command of 471 officers and enlisted men.

Battle 
Spotting a camp of 61 lodges on Little Muddy Creek, Colonel Miles left his infantry and moved in with cavalry under Captain Edward Ball and mounted infantry under Lieutenant Edward W. Casey. The mounted force reached Lame Deer's sleeping village before dawn at 4:30 a.m. Company H of the 2nd Cavalry under Lieutenant Lovell H. Jerome and the mounted infantry under Casey began the fight with a mounted charge into the village. One of the army's Indian scouts, Hump, called to the Lakota and Cheyenne that Miles wanted to negotiate with them.

Lame Deer approached Miles accompanied by his nephew Iron Star and two others. Miles told Lame Deer to lay down his rifle, which he did, but cocked and facing forward. When White Bull, one of Miles's scouts, tried to take Iron Star's rifle, he fired, with the bullet going through White Bull's coat. Lame Deer grabbed his weapon on the ground and fired it at Miles, the bullet just missing him and killing his orderly, Private Charles Shrenger. Chaos ensued. Several soldiers and Lakota were hit in the gunfire. Lame Deer was shot down by a volley of 17 bullets fired by men of Company L, 2nd Cavalry. Companies F, G, and L of the 2nd Cavalry then attacked the small and defenseless Indian village, destroying it and capturing about 450 horses, killing half of them.

Aftermath 
The army had four men killed and ten wounded in the engagement, while the Lakota suffered from 5–14 killed, and about 20 wounded and 40 captured. Five Congressional Medals of Honor were awarded to soldiers for their actions during the battle:
 Henry Wilkens – first sergeant, Company L, 2nd Cavalry
 William H. Jones – sergeant, Company L, 2nd Cavalry
 Harry Garland – corporal, Company L, 2nd Cavalry
 William Leonard – private, Company L, 2nd Cavalry
 Samuel D. Phillips – private, Company H, 2nd Cavalry

A Purple Heart was awarded to David L. Brainard on January 27, 1933; one of only 12 awarded for the American Indian Wars.

Order of battle 

United States Army, Colonel Nelson A. Miles
 2nd Cavalry Regiment, Companies F, G, H, L, Captain Edward Ball
 5th Infantry Regiment, Companies B, H
 22nd Infantry Regiment, Companies E, F, G, H
 Indian Scouts

Native Americans, Chief Lame Deer
 Miniconjou Lakota
 Northern Cheyenne

Footnotes

Bibliography 

 
 

1877 in the United States
Battles involving the Sioux
Indian wars of the American Old West
May 1877 events
Montana Territory